Sri Venkateswara Public School (also known as S.V. Public School) is located in port town of Machilipatnam in Andhra Pradesh in India.

Schools in Krishna district
Educational institutions in India with year of establishment missing